Ambition is former Styx guitarist/vocalist Tommy Shaw's third solo album release. It was produced by Terry Thomas (from the rock band, Charlie) and has a very fluid and melodic sound with rich synthesizer chords and sequences. Originally released on Atlantic Records in 1987.
The album was re-released on American Beat Records in 2007.

Track listing
All words & music by Tommy Shaw & Terry Thomas unless where otherwise noted.
 "No Such Thing" - 3:58
 "Dangerous Game" - 4:53
 "The Weight of the World" - 4:56
 "Ambition" - 4:26
 "Ever Since the World Began" (Frankie Sullivan, Jim Peterik)- 4:08
 "Are You Ready for Me" - 4:18
 "Somewhere in the Night" - 4:40
 "Love You Too Much" - 4:03
 "The Outsider" - 4:54
 "Lay Them Down" (Shaw) - 4:15

Personnel
Tommy Shaw: Guitars, Lead Vocals, Background Vocals
Tony Beard: Drums
Felix Krish: Bass Guitar, Fretless Bass Guitar, Bass Synth
Paul Wickens: Keyboards
Peter-John Vettese: Keyboards on "Ever Since the World Began"
Richie Cannata: Saxophone
Steve Alexander: Percussion, Drum overdubs
Christopher O'Shaughnessy: Lead Guitar on "Are You Ready for Me" and "Ambition"
Terry Thomas: Guitar, Keyboards, Drum programming, Background Vocals
Lea Hart: Background Vocals
Dee & Shirley Lewis: Background Vocals
Helena Springs: Background Vocals
James "JY" Young: Background Vocals

Singles
"No Such Thing"
"Ever Since the World Began" (#75 US)

References

1987 albums
Tommy Shaw albums
Atlantic Records albums